The Machapunga were a small Algonquian language–speaking Native American tribe from coastal northeastern North Carolina. They were part of the Secotan people. They were a group from the Powhatan Confederacy who migrated from present-day Virginia. They are now extinct as a tribe.

Name 
Anthropologist John Reed Swanton wrote that Machapunga meant "bad dust" or "much dirt" in their Algonquian language. They were also called the Mattamuskeet Indians.

Territory 
The Machapunga lived in what is now Hyde County, North Carolina. Their lands may have extended into present-day Beaufort, North Carolina, as well as Washington, Tyrrell, and Dare counties. The Machapunga lived in the Pungo River area.

Their primary village was Mattamuskeet, likely located on the shore of Mattamuskeet Lake in present-day Hyde County.

History
Early 20th-century ethnographer Frank Speck believed that the historical Machapunga and other Algonquian tribes in North Carolina had probably been earlier connected to the larger population based in coastal Virginia. He believed the tribes in North Carolina were part of an early and large Algonquian migration south after European contact. He noted the presence of Algonquian-speaking tribes on the Northeast coast and in eastern and central Canada.

16th century 
When the British founded their colonist on Roanoke Island that lasted from 1586 to 1685, displaced Secotan people moved in with the Machapunga.

17th century 
In 1600, ethnographer James Mooney estimated there were 1,200 Machapunga and related tribes. 

John Squires (Machapunga, 1676-1724) served as the tribe's chief. His mother was Ethelia, married to an Englishman named Jonathan Squires. Ethelia's father was the chief of the Nanticoke in Dorchester County Maryland, but her mother was Machapunga, thus having made John the Chief of the Machapunga. John owned and operated a trading post, with another Indian named Long Tom off of the Old Indian Trail on the Chesapeake Bay. They were summoned many times by the English Colonists to interpret for them and helped settle many differences between the Colonists and the Indians. John's parents, Jonathan and Ethelia, continued to reside on the Nanticoke land in Dorchester County, Maryland.

18th century 
By 1701, they consolidated into a single village. In 1701, English explorer John Lawson wrote that the tribe had about 100 members. 

In 1711 they participated in the Tuscarora War against the colonists. By 1715, the remaining members of the Coree, who lived to the south, had been merged into the Machapunga and lived together with them in Mattamuskeet.

A small group of Machapunga still resided in North Carolina in 1761, with only 7 to 8 warriors. Then missionary Rev. Alexander Stewart wrote that he had baptized seven "Attamuskeet, Hatteras, and Roanoke" adults and children. In 1763, he baptized 21 more Native people from that region.

Notes

References

External links
 Roanoke: The Abandoned Colony, Second Edition, Karen Ordahl Kupperman

Algonquian ethnonyms
Algonquian peoples
Extinct languages of North America
Extinct Native American tribes
Native American history of North Carolina
Native American tribes in North Carolina